Thomas Ellis Robins, 1st Baron Robins KBE, DSO (31 October 1884 – 21 July 1962), known as Sir Ellis Robins between 1946 and 1958, was an American-born British businessman and public servant, mainly based in Rhodesia.

Background and education
Robins was born in the United States, the son of Major Robert Patterson Robins, a medical doctor, and Mary Routh Ellis, daughter of Thomas de la Roche Ellis, of Elliston, Louisiana. He was educated at the Bight School, Philadelphia, the University of Pennsylvania, where he was a member of the Philomathean Society, and Christ Church, Oxford, where he was the first Rhodes scholar.

Public life
After a year at Oxford, Robins went to Africa where he joined the British South Africa Company, the company established by Cecil Rhodes, and was entrusted with several important posts in Rhodesia. He became a British citizen in 1912. He fought with the City of London Yeomanry in Egypt, Gallipoli and Palestine during the First World War, was twice mentioned in despatches and awarded the Distinguished Service Order. In 1928 he became general manager of the British South Africa Company, which he remained until 1933, and was then a resident director of the company in South Africa until 1957. He was also a director of the Rhodesia Railway Trust, the Rhodesia Land Bank and the Anglo-American Corporation of South Africa. He commanded the 1st Regiment of the Rhodesia Regiment between 1940 and 1943 and was knighted in 1946, in recognition of his "public services in Rhodesia". He hosted the visit of Queen Elizabeth The Queen Mother to Rhodesia in 1953, the centenary of Cecil Rhodes's birth. He was made a Knight Commander of the Order of the British Empire (KBE) the following year and was raised to the peerage as Baron Robins, of Rhodesia and Chelsea in the County of London, in 1958. Robins was also a freemason.

Personal life
Lord Robins married Mary St Quintin Wroughton, daughter of Philip Wroughton, of Woolley Park, Wantage, Berkshire, in 1912. He died in July 1962, aged 77, when the barony became extinct. The Ellis Robins School, Harare and Ellis House at Peterhouse Boys' School are named after him.

Arms

References

External links

1884 births
1962 deaths
University of Pennsylvania alumni
Alumni of Christ Church, Oxford
American Rhodes Scholars
Companions of the Distinguished Service Order
Knights Commander of the Order of the British Empire
City of London Yeomanry (Rough Riders) officers
Hereditary barons created by Elizabeth II